North Yorkshire was a European Parliament constituency covering much of the county of North Yorkshire in England.

Prior to its uniform adoption of proportional representation in 1999, the United Kingdom used first-past-the-post for the European elections in England, Scotland and Wales. The European Parliament constituencies used under that system were smaller than the later regional constituencies and only had one Member of the European Parliament each.

The constituency was created in 1994, incorporating most of the former York constituency and part of Cleveland and Yorkshire North.  It consisted of the Westminster Parliament constituencies (on their 1983 boundaries) of Harrogate, Ryedale, Scarborough, Selby, Skipton and Ripon and York.

The seat became part of the much larger Yorkshire and the Humber constituency in 1999.

Members of the European Parliament

Results

|- style="background-color:#F6F6F6"
! style="background-color: " |
| colspan="2"   | New creation:  gain.
| align="right" | Swing
| align="right" | N/A
||

References

External links
 David Boothroyd's United Kingdom Election Results

European Parliament constituencies in England (1979–1999)
Politics of North Yorkshire
1994 establishments in England
1999 disestablishments in England
Constituencies established in 1994
Constituencies disestablished in 1999